DXBC (693 AM) RMN Butuan is a radio station owned and operated by the Radio Mindanao Network. The station's studio and transmitter are located along I. Elloso St., Brgy. Imadejas, Butuan. Established on August 17, 1955, DXBC is the pioneer AM station in the city. The signal can be reached as far as Surigao, Southern Leyte, Leyte, southern parts of Samar, southern parts of Eastern Samar and southern parts of Cebu and Bohol via unclear signal.

References

Radio stations in Butuan
Radio stations established in 1955
News and talk radio stations in the Philippines